Sherif Alaa is an Egyptian football player currently playing for Zamalek

References

External links
 

1992 births
Living people
Egyptian footballers
Association football defenders
Zamalek SC players
Al Mokawloon Al Arab SC players